The County Antrim & District Football Association (also known as the North East Ulster Football Association but more commonly as the Co. Antrim FA) is the largest of the four regional football associations within Northern Ireland and affiliated to the Irish FA, the others being the Mid-Ulster FA, the North-West of Ireland FA and the Fermanagh & Western FA.

History
The Co. Antrim FA held its inaugural meeting on 23 April 1888 at the Commercial Hotel, Donegall Street, Belfast.  The founding seven member clubs were Belfast Athletics, Cliftonville, Clarence, Distillery, YMCA, Oldpark and Whiteabbey. These clubs were joined shortly thereafter by Ballyclare, Linfield Athletics, Mountcollyer and Beechmount.  In the intervening years the membership has grown from these eleven clubs to in excess of 500. In 1896, the jurisdiction of the Association was extended beyond County Antrim to include all clubs within the Parliamentary boundaries of Belfast, thus including some within County Down.

Aided by a grant from the Irish FA, the Co. Antrim FA set about organising a competition for its members, the County Antrim Senior Challenge Shield, for which the first round draw was made in November 1888.  Also organised were a fund raising match, held between Cliftonville and "The Rest", and a first representative fixture, lost 6-2 to a touring side from Canada.  In the first few years of its existence Co. Antrim FA XIs also faced teams representing Co. Londonderry, Mid-Ulster and the Irish FA.

Continued expansion of football in the region permitted the Co. Antrim FA to found further competitions, the Steel & Sons Cup in 1895 and the County Antrim Junior Shield in 1900. Regular representative fixtures continued until the 1950s when financial losses incurred on trips to face the Sheffield and Hallamshire FA proved too much for the Association to bear.

In 1988, to celebrate the Co. Antrim FA's centenary a special competition was organised - The County Antrim FA Centenary Chalice.  The specially produced crystal trophy was won by Glentoran who defeated Ballymena United 4-2 in the final at Windsor Park, Belfast. That same season a County Antrim Select lost 6-2 to a Combined Mid-Ulster/North-West Select in a commemorative match at Windsor Park.

Today
The Co. Antrim FA now has over 500 member clubs, spread beyond the traditional boundaries of Co. Antrim into mid-, north and east County Down.  Membership comes from all levels of football within Northern Ireland, from the senior, intermediate, junior and youth leagues and includes the reserve teams of many NIFL Premiership clubs.

Competitions
 Senior Shield (founded 1888) - Open to senior and selected intermediate teams (usually based on performances in the previous season's Steel Cup).
 Steel & Sons Cup (founded 1895) - Open to intermediate teams only, including senior clubs' reserve teams.
 Junior Shield (founded 1900) - Open to junior teams only
 Centenary Chalice (one-off competition held in 1988) - Open to senior and selected intermediate teams.
 Women's Challenge Cup (founded 2013)

Representative Matches
Selected representative matches played by Co. Antrim FA Selects.

Chairmen & Presidents

Chairmen
 1888-1898 (office not in existence)
 1912-1916 G.D. Jenkins
 1912-1916 R. Ervine
 1916-1943 J.M. Small
 1943-1966 F.J. Cochrane (also Irish FA President 1948-1957)
 1966-1967 T. Moorhead
 1967-1985 W. Carlisle
 Designation of post changed to president in 1985

Presidents
 1985-1989 H.A Johnstone
 1989-1991 D. Crawford
 1991-1993 J. Boyce (also Irish FA President 1995-2007)
 1993-1995 B.K. McGaughey
 1995-1997 G.F.W. McIlwrath
 1997-1999 T.E. Pateman
 1999-2000 B.H. Dunlop
 2001-2004 S.J. Shaw
 2004-2006 F.G. Magee
 2006-2008 B. Reid
 2008-2010 J.T. Hamilton
 2010-2012 R. Haworth
 2012-date C. Wilson

References

 
Association football governing bodies in Northern Ireland
Sports organizations established in 1888